The 1997 Island Games were the seventh Island Games, and were held in Jersey, from June 28, to July 4, 1997.

Medal table

Sports
The sports chosen for the games were:

External links
 Jersey 1997
 Island Games 1997

Island Games
Sport in Jersey
Island Games, 1997
Island Games
International sports competitions hosted by the Channel Islands
Multi-sport events in the Channel Islands
June 1997 sports events in Europe
July 1997 sports events in Europe